Cadillac Man is a 1990 American black comedy film directed by Roger Donaldson, starring Robin Williams and Tim Robbins.

The plot of the film centers on car salesman Joey O'Brien (Williams) whose life is consumed by turmoil, which all comes to a head when his dealership is taken hostage by Larry (Robbins), a crazed motorcyclist.

The film received mixed reviews from critics but performed above its production budget at the box office, grossing $27.6 million against its $15 million budget.

Plot
Queens car salesman Joey O'Brien must deal with the ever-increasing pressures in his life: he has an ex-wife demanding alimony, a daughter who is missing, a married mistress and a single mistress who are both desperately in love with him, and a two-day deadline to either sell twelve cars or lose his job. In addition, he has an outstanding loan to a Mafia don which he must either quickly repay, or lose his life.

On the day of the big dealership car sale (and the final day of O'Brien's deadline), the car dealership is taken hostage by Larry, an AK-47-toting motorcyclist who believes his wife is cheating on him. Joey manages to talk Larry out of doing any harm by claiming he is the one sleeping with Larry's wife. As police surround the dealership, Joey and Larry begin to bond, and Joey convinces Larry to give himself up. Without realizing Larry's gun is not loaded, the police wound him after most of the hostages have already been released. Joey promises to remain with him while he recovers, and confesses that he'd never actually slept with Larry's wife. The crisis solves all of Joey's problems: his mistresses learn of each other and dump him, his daughter returns, his job is secure, the Mafia don (whose son was among the hostages) forgives his debt, and he begins to reconcile with his ex-wife.

Cast

Production

To prepare for his role in the film Williams spent time in car dealerships in Queens, New York.

Release
The film was not a box office success, although it did turn a profit.

Reception
On Rotten Tomatoes the film has an approval rating of 58% based on 12 reviews. Metacritic gives it a score of 50 out of 100 based on 21 critic reviews. Audiences surveyed by CinemaScore gave the film a grade "B−" on scale of A to F.

Critic Roger Ebert had mixed feelings about the film, giving it a two out of four stars, stating, "My problems with Cadillac Man were probably inspired more by false expectations than by anything on the screen, and maybe if Robbins had come crashing in through the window in the first scene I would have liked it more." Variety thought it had "the distinction of being the loudest film of 1990 and one of the worst."

References

External links 
 
 
 
 

1990 films
1990s crime comedy films
1990s buddy comedy films
American business films
American crime comedy films
Cadillac
Films directed by Roger Donaldson
Films produced by Charles Roven
Films set in Brooklyn
Films about hostage takings
Orion Pictures films
Adultery in films
Films about car dealerships
Films scored by J. Peter Robinson
1990 comedy films
American buddy comedy films
1990s English-language films
1990s American films
Films about salespeople